Bear Creek is a  long 4th order tributary to the Rocky River in Chatham County, North Carolina.

Course
Bear Creek rises about 4 miles west-southwest of Bonlee, North Carolina in Chatham County and then follows an easterly course to join the Rocky River about 6 miles south of Pittsboro.

Watershed
Bear Creek drains  of area, receives about 47.6 in/year of precipitation, has a wetness index of 444.18 and is about 55% forested.

References

Rivers of North Carolina
Rivers of Chatham County, North Carolina